Caio César Alves dos Santos (born 29 May 1986), or simply Caio, is a Brazilian professional football player who plays for Brazilian side Desportivo Brasil, as an attacking midfielder.

References

External links
 
 Caio at eintracht-archiv.de 

1986 births
Living people
Association football midfielders
Brazilian footballers
Grêmio Barueri Futebol players
Guarani FC players
Sport Club Internacional players
Sociedade Esportiva Palmeiras players
Eintracht Frankfurt players
Esporte Clube Bahia players
Atlético Clube Goianiense players
Grasshopper Club Zürich players
Maccabi Haifa F.C. players
Hapoel Tel Aviv F.C. players
Desportivo Brasil players
Campeonato Brasileiro Série A players
Bundesliga players
2. Bundesliga players
Swiss Super League players
Brazilian expatriate footballers
Expatriate footballers in Germany
Expatriate footballers in Switzerland
Expatriate footballers in Israel
Brazilian expatriate sportspeople in Germany
Brazilian expatriate sportspeople in Switzerland
Brazilian expatriate sportspeople in Israel
People from Mirandópolis